Nteje is the headquarters of Oyi Local Government Area of Anambra State, Nigeria. It is situated about 25 kilometres north-east of Onitsha by land route. It is located on the map along the longitude 6.45°E and the latitude 6.14°N. The land is fairly low, about 500 feet above sea level.

It is bounded by Nkwelle-Ezunaka to the west (Oyi LGA), Awkuzu and Umunya to the South (both in Oyi LGA), Ukwulu to the East (Dunukofia LGA), Aguleri , umuleri and Nando to the North (Anambra East LGA)>

Subdivisions
Like most towns in the Aguleri axis, the town is divided into three parts: Ezi, Ifite and Ikenga.

Ezi consists of the following villages; Umuefi, Ezioye, Amadiaba, Ubili, Umuanunwa, Egbengwu, Amupa, and Iruoyim.
Ifite consists of Agwa, Orukabi, Akamanato, Amansi, and Umuejiofor.
Ikenga consists of Ikenga, Achallagu, Achalauno, and Umuazu.

Notable residents
Notable people from Nteje include:

Pete Edochie, Nigerian actor
Yul Edochie, Nigerian actor
Rita Edochie, Nigerian actor

References 

Populated places in Anambra State